Cabaret Voltaire was the name of a short-lived artistic nightclub in Zürich, Switzerland in 1916 (revived in the 21st century). It was founded by Hugo Ball, with his companion Emmy Hennings, in the back room of Holländische Meierei, Spiegelgasse 1, on February 5, 1916, as a cabaret for artistic and political purposes. Other founding members were Marcel Janco, Richard Huelsenbeck, Tristan Tzara, and Sophie Taeuber-Arp and Jean Arp.

Events at the cabaret proved pivotal in the founding of the anarchic art movement known as Dada. In 2013, the Cabaret Voltaire performances were collectively ranked by Dale Eisinger of Complex as the 25th best work of performance art in history.

Cabaret Voltaire closed in the summer of 1916, but the Cabaret was revived in the same building in the 21st century.

History

Switzerland was a neutral country during World War I and among the many refugees coming to Zürich were artists from all over Europe. Ball and Hennings approached Ephraim Jan, patron of the Holländische Meierei at Spiegelgasse 1, which had already hosted Zürich's first literary cabaret, the Pantagruel in 1915. Jan permitted them to use the back room for events. The press release on 2 February 1916 announcing the opening of the club reads:

The Cabaret Voltaire. Under this name a group of young artists and writers has formed with the object of becoming a center for artistic entertainment. In principle, the Cabaret will be run by artists, permanent guests, who, following their daily reunions, will give musical or literary performances. Young Zürich artists, of all tendencies, are invited to join us with suggestions and proposals.

The cabaret featured spoken word, dance and music. The soirees were often raucous events with artists experimenting with new forms of performance, such as sound poetry and simultaneous poetry. Mirroring the maelstrom of World War I raging around it, the art it exhibited was often chaotic and brutal. On at least one occasion, the audience attacked the cabaret's stage. Though the cabaret was to be the birthplace of the Dadaist movement, it featured artists from every sector of the avant-garde, including Futurism's Marinetti. The cabaret exhibited radically experimental artists, many of whom went on to change the face of their artistic disciplines; featured artists included Wassily Kandinsky, Paul Klee, Giorgio de Chirico, Sophie Taeuber-Arp, and Max Ernst.

On July 28, 1916, Ball read out his Dada Manifesto. In June, Ball had also published a journal with the same name. It featured work from artists such as the poet Guillaume Apollinaire, and had a cover designed by Arp.

The cabaret closed in the summer of 1916.

While the Dada movement was just beginning, by 1917 the excitement generated by Cabaret Voltaire had fizzled out, and the artists moved on to other places in Zürich such as the Galerie Dada at Bahnhofstrasse 19, and later Paris and Berlin.

21st century revival

After the turn of the millennium, the building which had housed Cabaret Voltaire in 1916 had fallen into disrepair, and in the winter of 2001/2002 a group of artists describing themselves as neo-Dadaists, organised by Mark Divo, squatted the building to protest its planned closure. They declared that it was a signal for a new generation of artists to align themselves with a revival of Dada.

Over a period of three months there was a number of performances, parties, poetry evenings and film nights. Among the participating artists were Ingo Giezendanner, Lennie Lee, Leumund Cult, Mickry3, xeno volcano, elektra sturmschnell, Aiana Calugar, and Dan Jones. The building was decorated on the outside as well as the inside. Thousands of people from around Zürich took part in the experiment. On April 2, 2002 police evicted the occupants.

A new cabaret has since opened in the building, with an extensive programme of events such as, Hugo Ball: Fuga saeculi, in 2008, curated by Bazon Brock and included a performance of Gabriella Daris' corporeal poem LopLop: WORD or WOman biRD (an homage to Max Ernst's namesake collage from 1921) as well as a film projection by Werner Nekes, and the 2008 exhibition Dreamachine: David Woodard, Sheela Birnstiel, Christian Kracht.

More recently, Cabaret Voltaire has adopted personalities and celebrated them as Dadaists, such as Alexander Archipenko, Tatsuo Okada and Mikhail Bakunin. Cabaret Voltaire sponsored the restoration of Bakunin's grave plate in the Bremgarten cemetery in Bern, adding a portrait by Swiss artist Daniel Garbade and the Bakunin quote: "By striving to do the impossible, man has always achieved what is possible." In 2020, the first season of the television show The Fugitive Game, which focusses on German poet Emmy Hennings, was filmed on location at Cabaret Voltaire.

In popular culture
 The electronic band Cabaret Voltaire was named as so in reference to the club, drawing inspiration from Dadaism and incorporating it in their earliest albums.

References

External links

Dada and Surrealism: Texts and Extracts
Cabaret Voltaire homepage, archive from 10 December 2018

Dada
Underground culture
Modernist theatre
Culture of Zürich
Squats
Former squats